Nursery is a residential area of Karachi, Sindh, Pakistan. Situated on the main city road Shahrah-e-Faisal, it is part of PECHS neighborhood within Jamshed Town.

References

External links
 Karachi website - Archived

Neighbourhoods of Karachi